Chocolat is a 1999 novel by Joanne Harris. It tells the story of Vianne Rocher, a young single mother, who arrives in the French village of Lansquenet-sous-Tannes at the beginning of Lent with her six-year-old daughter, Anouk.  Vianne has arrived to open a chocolaterieLa Céleste Pralinewhich is on the square opposite the church. During the traditional season of fasting and self-denial she gently changes the lives of the villagers who visit her with a combination of sympathy, subversion and a little magic.

This scandalises Francis Reynaud, the village priest, and his supporters. As tensions run high, the community is increasingly divided. As Easter approaches the ritual of the Church is pitted against the indulgence of chocolate, and Father Reynaud and Vianne Rocher face an inevitable showdown.

Harris has indicated that several of the characters were influenced by individuals in her life: Her daughter forms the basis for the young Anouk, including her imaginary rabbit, Pantoufle.  Harris' strong-willed and independent great-grandmother influenced her portrayal of both Vianne and the elderly Armande.

The Lollipop Shoes, the first sequel, was published in the United Kingdom in 2007 (released in 2008 as The Girl with No Shadow in the US) 
and in 2012, the second sequel was published, entitled Peaches for Monsieur le Curé. (Peaches for Father Francis in the US)

Plot
Vianne Rocher, with her daughter Anouk, come to the small French village of Lansquenet-sous-Tannes. They are brought by "the wind" during the last days of Carnival to open a chocolaterie, La Céleste Praline. The village priest, Francis Reynaud, is mystified by their arrival because Lent has just begun, but his confusion turns rapidly to anger when he understands that Vianne holds dangerous beliefs, does not obey the church and flouts the unspoken rules that he feels should govern his "flock".

Vianne, we learn from her personal thoughts, is a witch, though she does not use the word. Her mother and she were wanderers, going from one city to another. Her mother strove to inspire the same need for freedom in her daughter, who is more social and passive. They were born with gifts, and used a kind of "domestic magic" to earn their living. Throughout her life, Vianne has been running from the "Black Man", a recurring motif in her mother's folklore. When her mother dies of terminal cancer, Vianne continues on her own, trying to evade the Black Man and the mysterious force of the wind and settle down to a normal life.

The chocolaterie is an old dream of hers. She has an innate talent for cooking and a charming personality. She tries to fit in and help her customers. She starts to build a group of regular customers, and, to Reynaud's dismay, she doesn't go out of business.

Reynaud attempts to have Vianne run out of town, and he talks about her every Sunday at church. Some people stay away, but not for long. His conflict with her becomes his personal crusade. Vianne, however, announces a "Grand Festival of Chocolate", to be held on Easter Sunday.

Characters
Vianne Rocher, single mother of Anouk who arrives at the village of Lasquennet-sous-les-Tannes and opens a chocolaterie at the beginning of Lent. She is described as taller than the average woman, with black curly hair, "dark eyes that seem pupilless", straight brows that would make her face stern if not for the amused quirk of her mouth, a little too big. Her favourite scent is mimosa. She loves Anouk very much, and her greatest fear is that they will be torn apart. She has a friendly, charming personality, but stubborn too, and she stands up for her beliefs, in a mild yet firm manner. She also has a keen sense of people and great powers of intuition.
Francis Reynaud, village priest. He tries to make Vianne and her daughter leave as he believes her shop inappropriate. He comes to believe that she is Satan's helper. He is fanatical and puritanical in his beliefs, due to the inspiration of Père Michel, his predecessor, and his troubled childhood. He has a strong sense of dignity, which might be mistaken for pride sometimes, an obsession with following the rules and believes himself superior in terms of moral strength and intellect as he observes with chagrined disdain in one of his confessions.
Anouk Rocher, Vianne's daughter. A precocious child with an imaginary animal friend, called Pantoufle, that is also seen by her mother.
Josephine Muscat, the wife of Paul-Marie Muscat. At the beginning of the book she is a silent fearful figure, the result of the incessant brutal treatment received at the hand of her husband. She starts to hope after Vianne offers her friendship, and finally she leaves her husband. Vianne offers her a job and residence at her chocolaterie, arguing that if she leaves the town, she'll never stop running. Under her guidance, Josephine transforms, becoming stronger, more self-confident and charming.
Paul-Marie Muscat, married to Josephine, using her as his servant. He beats her often and he drinks too much. Under his father's guidance he developed a cruel personality that, coupled with his need for vengeance, made him incinerate Roux's boat.
Armande Voizin, mother of Caroline Clairmont. The first to anticipate the changes Vianne's arrival would bring. She believes Vianne is also a witch, though Vianne doesn't agree with the word. They become friends, due to a similarity in personalities and the freedom of spirit they both share. Vianne helps Armande reconnect with her grandson, Luc, and Armande helps Vianne after one of Reynaud's strong sermons. She has a secret love of underwear and the poetry of Rimbaud. It is revealed that when she was a very good climber, she would often throw things at passers-by from the trees. She has a strong disdain for Reynaud and some of the villagers that follow him blindly, who she calls 'bible groupies'.
Caroline Clairmont, one of the 'bible groupies'. Has a poor relationship with her mother, the result of which was banning Luc from seeing his grandmother. She is superficial and spiteful, and she fusses too much over Armande, a fact which the latter hates. She's quick to point out everyone else's mistakes but not her own and rarely does anything without expecting something in return.
Luc Clairmont, Caroline Clairmont's son, whom she raised with obsessive care. Luc has a penchant for the dark and bizarre which he's been hiding for fear of upsetting his mother.
Guillaume, elderly gentleman, devoted to his sick dog, Charly.
Narcisse, local farmer and florist.
Roux, red-haired river-gypsy.
Zezette and Blanche, river-gypsies.

Reception

It won the Creative Freedom Award (2000) and the Whittaker Gold and Platinum Awards (2001, 2012).

It was shortlisted for the Whitbread Prize and the Scripter Award (2001).

Charles de Lint praised the novel, saying "Harris's prose is an absolute delight" comparing Chocolat to Like Water for Chocolate.

Setting

The village of Lansquenet-sous-Tannes is a fictional village in the Gers region of South-Western France, featured in the novels of Joanne Harris. Situated on the (imaginary) river Tannes, a tributary of the Garonne, it is described as "a blip on the fast road between Toulouse and Bordeaux". A small rural community of only a few hundred people, it is the setting of the novel Chocolat as well as Harris' later novels, Blackberry Wine and Peaches for Monsieur le Curé. There seems to be evidence to suggest that Lansquenet-sous-Tannes was based on the town of Nérac, on the river Baïse, where Harris spent some of her childhood holidays, and which is very close to a tiny village called Vianne.

The name of Lansquenet-sous-Tannes is ambiguous. The word "lansquenet" refers to an old card game. "Sous Tannes", or "under the Tannes" is also phonetically identical to the French word "soutane", a priest's cassock. This may be a reference to the traditionalist, Catholic nature of the community depicted in the Chocolat books. Lansquenet is portrayed as an insular, close community, run by gossip and the Church.

Most of the inhabitants are elderly; young people have mostly moved to the towns and cities to find work. It is an old bastide and retains the fortress mentality of its past. Outsiders are not welcome; old grudges linger; the inhabitants of neighbouring villages are seen as traditional enemies.  Similarly in Peaches for Monsieur le Curé, the presence of a community of Moroccan immigrants, with their new customs and different religious beliefs, causes friction. Lansquenet has acquired a significant following among Harris' readers. In a piece written for the Telegraph in July 2012, she describes her own affection for Lansquenet, as well as that of her readers, many of whom have written to her to say that they have found the place, and therefore know that it exists.

Film adaptation

The film adaptation was released in 2000, directed by Lasse Hallström and starring Juliette Binoche, Judi Dench, Alfred Molina, Lena Olin and Johnny Depp. It was nominated for 8 BAFTAS and 5 Oscars.

Release details
1999, UK, Doubleday, Pub date 4 March 1999, hardback (First edition)
2000, UK, Black Swan, Pub date 2 March 2000, paperback
1999, USA, Viking Adult, Pub date February 1999, hardback
2000, USA, Penguin Books, Pub date January 2000, paperback
2000, USA, Penguin Books, Pub date November 2000, paperback (film tie-in edition)
2000, Australia, Black Swan, Pub date 2000, paperback (film tie-in edition)

Sequel

A sequel to Chocolat, entitled The Lollipop Shoes (retitled The Girl With No Shadow in the US), was published in 2007. A further chapter in Vianne's story, Peaches for Monsieur le Curé (Peaches for Father Francis in the US) followed in 2012.

References

Telegraph article

External links
Joanne Harris Official Website

1999 British novels
Novels by Joanne Harris
British novels adapted into films
British magic realism novels
Novels set in France
Doubleday (publisher) books
Gers